Daula is the first month of the Mandaean calendar. The month begins with Dehwa Rabba, or New Year's Day. Dehwa d-Šišlam Rabba is celebrated on the sixth day of the month.

It is the Mandaic name for the constellation Aquarius. It currently corresponds to Jul / Aug in the Gregorian calendar due to a lack of a leap year in the Mandaean calendar.

References

Months of the Mandaean calendar
Aquarius in astrology